Ex-ex-gay people are those who formerly participated in the ex-gay movement in an attempt to change their sexual orientation to heterosexual, but who then later went on to publicly state they had a non-heterosexual sexual orientation.

Organizations in the ex-gay movement such as Exodus International offer conversion therapy, with the claim that an LGBT person's involvement in the programming can change their sexual orientation to heterosexual. This type of programming is opposed by major medical organizations in the US, including The National Association of Social Workers, The American Psychological Association, The American Psychiatric Association, The American Counseling Association, and The American Academy of Pediatrics. The American Psychiatric Association describes conversion therapy as ineffective at changing sexual orientation, and as harmful to the LGBT person's well-being. It is also opposed by the United Kingdom Council for Psychotherapy, who issued a joint leaflet with the British Psychoanalytic Council, the Royal College of Psychiatrists, the British Association for Counselling and Psychotherapy, the British Psychological Society, Pink Therapy, The National Counselling Society and LGBT rights group Stonewall against such practices.

Three publicly ex-ex-gay people are Günter Baum, Peterson Toscano and Christine Bakke. In April 2007, Toscano and Bakke founded Beyond Ex-Gay, an on-line resource for ex-ex gays. In June 2007, together with Soulforce and the LGBT Resource Center at University of California, Irvine organized the first-ever Ex-Gay Survivor Conference.

In 1979, Exodus International's co-founder Michael Bussee and his partner, Gary Cooper, quit the group and held a life commitment ceremony together. On June 27, 2007, Bussee, along with fellow former Exodus leaders Jeremy Marks and Darlene Bogle, issued a public apology for their roles in Exodus. Exodus disbanded as an organization on June 20, 2013.

People who no longer support the ex-gay movement
Günter Baum founded an ex-gay ministry in Germany. Later he formed Zwischenraum, which helps gay Christians to accept their sexuality and to reconcile it with their beliefs.
Michael Bussee and Gary Cooper, co-founders of Exodus International, left the organization and in 1979, held a life commitment ceremony. Bussee went on to become an outspoken critic of Exodus and the ex-gay movement. In June 2007, Bussee issued an apology for his part in the ex-gay movement.
 Ben Gresham is an Australian man who went through three years of ex-gay therapy starting at sixteen years of age. He does media appearances, including ABC TV's The Hack Half Hour, SX News and Triple J (radio) regarding what he sees as the dangers of ex-gay programs and the psychological harm associated with them. Along with this, Gresham is a part of "Freedom2b", which offers support to LGBT people from church backgrounds.
 Noe Gutierrez appeared in Warren Throckmorton's ex-gay video I Do Exist in 2004. This garnered some notice, as Gutierrez had previously appeared in a video for gay youth known as It's Elementary. Gutierrez later left the ex-gay movement and wrote about his experience.
 John Paulk, founder of Focus on the Family's ex-gay ministry Love Won Out and former chairman of Exodus International North America, renounced his claim to ex-gay status, denied that sexual orientation change is effective, and apologized for the harm he had caused in a formal apology in 2013.
 John Smid is the former director of the Memphis, Tennessee ex-gay ministry Love In Action, a position in which he was a leading spokesman for converting homosexuals into heterosexuals. In 2011, years after having left his Love In Action post, he stated that he was homosexual, and that he had "never met a man who experienced a change from homosexual to heterosexual."
 Peterson Toscano is an actor who was involved in the ex-gay movement for 17 years. He performs a related one-man satire titled Doin' Time in the Homo No Mo Halfway House, and with Christine Bakke runs Beyond Ex-Gay, a support website for people coming out of ex-gay experiences.
 Anthony Venn-Brown is a former Australian evangelist in the Assemblies of God and an author whose book, A Life of Unlearning, describes his experience in Australia's first ex-gay program. Venn-Brown co-founded Freedom2b, which offers support to LGBT people from church backgrounds and who have been displaced from the ex-gay movement. In 2007 he co-ordinated the release of a statement from five Australian ex-gay leaders who publicly apologized for their past actions. Venn-Brown has been a leader in monitoring ex-gay activities in Australia, New Zealand and Asia and countering the "ex-gay myth".
 McKrae Game founded Hope for Wholeness, one of the largest conversion therapy programs in the United States. He came out as gay in June 2019, two years after being fired from the program.
 David Matheson, a counselor who ran a weekend program offered by Rich Wyler's conversion therapy organization Brothers on a Road Less Traveled, came out via Facebook in early 2019 after a different private Facebook message by Wyler was obtained by the LGBT non-profit Truth Wins Out.

See also

 Queer theology
 Wayne Besen, gay rights activist and author of Anything But Straight

References

External links
 Beyond Ex-gay 
 Anything But Straight - archive of defunct official website
 Evangelicals Concerned, "Creating safe places for GLBT Christians."
 Reparative Therapy -- A  by J. G. Ford - archive of defunct website
 Ex-Gay Watch

Sexual orientation and psychology